St. Maches was a 6th-century princess and Pre-congregational saint of Cornwall and Devon. Maches was the sister of St. Cadog.

Born a daughter of Saint Gwynllyw and his wife Gwladys, Maches lived as a hermit, and was murdered by thieves, at Merthyr Maches (Llanfaches in the Kingdom of Gwent). She was buried in the monastery at Caerwent, now the parish church of St. Stephen at Caerwent, by Saint Tathan to whom the bandits had confessed the crime.

References

Southwestern Brythonic saints
English Roman Catholic saints
6th-century Christian saints
6th-century Christians
Year of birth unknown
6th-century English monarchs